Cidade Ademar may refer to:

 Subprefecture of Cidade Ademar, São Paulo
 Cidade Ademar (district of São Paulo)